This Present Darkness is a Christian novel by suspense, horror, and fantasy author Frank E. Peretti.  Published in 1986 by Crossway Books, This Present Darkness was Peretti's first published novel for adults and shows contemporary views on angels, demons, prayer, and spiritual warfare as demons and angels interact and struggle for control of the citizens of the small town of Ashton. It is critical of Eastern and New Age spiritual practices, portraying meditation as a means of demonic possession.

Sales were initially slow but jumped dramatically after singer Amy Grant promoted the book. The book has sold in excess of 2.7 million copies worldwide  and remained on the Christian Booksellers Association top best sellers list for over 150 consecutive weeks after its release. 

Its title comes from Ephesians 6:12 (RSV).  "For we are not contending against flesh and blood, but against the principalities, against the powers, against the world rulers of this present darkness, against the spiritual hosts of wickedness in the heavenly places."

Peretti followed This Present Darkness up with a sequel in 1988, Piercing the Darkness.

Plot summary
This Present Darkness takes place in the small college town of Ashton. Bernice Kreuger, a reporter for the Clarion, Ashton's town newspaper, is falsely arrested on prostitution charges after taking a photograph at the annual Ashton Summer Festival. When she is released the next day, she discovers that the film in her camera was destroyed.

Marshall Hogan, owner/editor-in-chief of the Clarion decides to go to the town police station/courthouse and confront Alf Brummel, the police chief, about the incident. Brummel denies any wrongdoing on behalf of the police department and insists it was all a mistake. Brummel then advises Marshall to drop the matter. Marshall does not fall for Brummel's story and, ignoring Brummel's advice, begins an investigation.

As the investigation continues, Marshall and Bernice begin to realize that they are onto something much bigger than they thought. They slowly uncover a plot to take over the town by buying the college, which is being carried out by The Universal Consciousness Society, a powerful New Age group. When the Society decides Marshall has found out too much they take the Clarion, and his house. They also falsely accuse him of murder, adultery, and molesting his daughter, who attends the college and who unwittingly has been pulled into the Society. When he and Bernice are caught in a desperate attempt to keep society from winning out, he is arrested and thrown in jail, and she escapes, running off to find help.

Meanwhile, Hank Busche, the unwanted pastor of the little Ashton Community Church discovers that there are many demons in the town and wonders why they have all congregated here. When he gets to be a nuisance to the demons they have the Society falsely arrest him for rape.

Hank and Marshall meet in jail. They compare stories and finally put both halves of the puzzle together.

During the time that this is happening, the story takes on a spiritual dimension—revealing a perspective based on the idea of unseen forces at work. The angels who wage warfare for the souls of mankind look and act similarly to humans—they have names, they are in charge of specific regions of earth, and they are propelled by heavenly forces that often manifest as wings. They wear armor and wield weapons forged in heaven—most notably, swords. Demons, as well, are depicted as being ink-like shadows in the darkness, flowing from shadow to shadow, until the time comes when they truly reveal themselves as monstrous beasts with bat-wings and armor. Their spiritual combat spans from one-on-one battles to vast armies charging into each other in the "unseen realms" above us.

Meanwhile, Bernice finds help and makes contact with the County Prosecutor, the State Attorney General, and the Feds. When Alf Brummel finds out about this he releases Hank and Marshall. After Hank and Marshall are released they "team up" against the Universal Consciousness Society and the demons working to take over Ashton—in which they are (possibly unwittingly) aided by a "local" demon whose position has been usurped by a somewhat more powerful one summoned by the Society, and strikes vengefully at the usurper.

Critical reception

The novel has been the subject of both literary and theological criticism. On literary grounds, several reviewers such as Irving Hexham and James R. Lewis suggest that the novel fits into the genre of horror. Reviewers such as Steve Rabey and Michael Maudlin appreciate the novel's complex multi-layered plot. However, they find the novel's characters typecast in simplistic roles of good versus evil. Other criticisms raised concern about redundant passages in the novel, stilted dialogue, and poor grammar.

Authority figures within the disciplines of Christian missions, such as A. Scott Moreau and Paul Hiebert, detect a dualist cosmology in the novels that are influenced by Zoroastrian and other mystery religion myths. These critics also argue that the novel's depiction of angel-demon combat and spiritual warfare techniques are tinged with animist ideas.  Ross Clifford and Philip S. Johnson claim that the conspiracy theory employed in the novel rests on a discredited interpretation of the New Age.

The New Testament scholar Robert Guelich believes and stated that the biblical metaphor of spiritual warfare has nothing to do with combat with demons, and argues that the novel's view of spiritual warfare is seriously at odds with those passages in the gospel accounts and Paul's epistles that refer to spiritual conflict and demons. J. Lanier Burns faults the novel for its weak understanding of personal responsibility for evil and sin and a correspondingly poor sense of God's sovereignty.

Christianity Today has stated the novel led the way for later Christian fiction such as the Left Behind novels.

It has also been described as potentially having racist overtones due to the villains all being "vaguely Hindu", and as possibly being an influence on the QAnon belief system. QAnon's messianic beliefs have also been connected to "the same culture previously captivated and emboldened" by Peretti's novels.

References

External links
Entry in FrankPeretti.com
A Summary Critique: This Present Darkness

1986 American novels
American Christian novels
Novels by Frank E. Peretti